The discography of Thunder, an English hard rock band, consists of fourteen studio albums, twenty-nine live albums, nine compilation albums, and twenty-two singles.

Albums

Studio albums

Live albums

Extended plays

Compilation albums

Singles

Videos

References

External links
 Official discography of Thunder

Discographies of British artists
Rock music group discographies